No Me Compares (Don't Compare Me) is the second studio album by the American salsa singer Frankie Negrón, released on September 28, 1998.

Track listing

Chart performance

Certification

References

1998 albums
Frankie Negrón albums
Warner Music Latina albums